Három álom is a second album by Hungarian singer Zoli Ádok, released 2011. The album contains 10 songs.

Track listing
 Három álom 4:26
 Légyott 3:54
 Száz csoda vár 4:13
 Itt egy szép világ 3:48
 Megrakják a tüzet 4:03
 Soha ne hidd 3:06
 Búcsúdal 3:51
 Ha te tudnád 2:33
 Itt egy szép világ 3:48
 Udvözöl a Való Világ 2:56

2011 albums
Zoli Ádok albums